Dioscorea spicata is a herbaceous perennial in the family Dioscoreaceae.

Description

Taxonomy
First described by Albrecht Wilhelm Roth in 1821. It is placed in Section Enantiophyllum.

Distribution
Indian subcontinent (see map in eMonocot).

Uses
The tubers are use as a food source.

References

Bibliography

 

spicata